Natali is an Italian surname. People with the surname include:

Antonio Natali (politician) (1921–1991), Italian politician
Antonio Natali (born 1951), Italian art historian and academic
Carlo Natali, also known as il Guardolino, (circa 1592-1683), Italian painter of the Baroque period
Carlo Giacomo Natali (1730–1791), Italian priest and author
Cesare Natali (born 1979), Italian footballer
Dino Natali, American actor
Elmo Natali (born 1927), American football player and coach
Elvira Natali (born 1996), Indonesian author, singer and actress
Giovanni Battista Natali, Italian painter of the late-Baroque period
Giovanni Battista Natali (bishop) (1628-1687), Italian Roman Catholic prelate who served as Bishop of Ston 
Jelal Kalyanji Natali (1899–1993), Indian-New Zealand shopkeeper, Indian community leader and anti-racism activist
Lorenzo Natali (1922–1989), Italian politician
Paul Natali (1933–2020), French politician and businessman
Renato Natali (1883-1979), Italian painter
Susan M. Natali (born 1969), American scientist
Valiano Natali (1918–2000), Italian operatic tenor
Vincenzo Natali (born 1969), American-Canadian film director and screenwriter

See also
Natali , disambiguation page
Natali (name), list of people with the given name
Italian-language surnames